Eurytides salvini, Salvin's kite swallowtail, is a species of butterfly found in the Neotropical realm in southern Veracruz, Tabasco, Oaxaca, Chiapas (south-eastern Mexico), Belize and Verapaz (Guatemala).

Description
The black bands very much reduced, a narrow band in the middle of the cell, not extending beyond the median vein; under surface glossy white; hindwing with black-brown discal band which runs almost straight from the costal margin to the red anal spot. 1. and 2. subcostals of the forewing distally confluent with the costa. Guatemala, British Honduras and (doubtfully) Yucatán; most of the specimens in collections come from the woods in northern Verapaz, Guatemala.

Status
Uncommon. No known threats.

Etymology
The name honours Osbert Salvin.

References

Further reading
D'Abrera, B. (1981). Butterflies of the Neotropical Region. Part I. Papilionidae and Pieridae. Lansdowne Editions, Melbourne, xvi + 172 pp.
D'Almeida, R.F. (1965). Catalogo dos Papilionidae Americanos. Sociedade Brasileira de Entomologia. São Paulo, Brasil.
Rothschild, W. and Jordan, K. (1906). A revision of the American Papilios. Novitates Zoologicae 13: 411-752. online (and as pdf) (Facsimile edition ed. P.H. Arnaud, 1967).

External links
 Butterflies of the Americas

Papilionidae of South America
Eurytides
Butterflies described in 1864